Samuel James is an actor.

Samuel James may also refer to:

Samuel Wooster James, American scientist

See also

Sam James (disambiguation)